Shirley Tse is an American contemporary artist born in Hong Kong (now a US citizen residing in Los Angeles). Tse's work is often installation based and incorporates sculpture, photography and video, and explores sculptural processes as models of multi-dimensional thinking and negotiation. She is faculty in the School of Art at California Institute of the Arts, and was the Co-Director of the Program in Art from 2011-2014. She is co-organizer of the ReMODEL Sculpture Education Now symposia series and has been visiting faculty at Yale School of Art, Northwestern University, California College of Arts and Crafts (San Francisco), and Claremont Graduate University.

Shirley Tse was born in the late 1960s in Hong Kong. Her sculptures, installations and photographs have been included in numerous museum exhibitions worldwide, among them are The Biennale of Sydney(including Polymathistyrene 2000), Bienal Ceara America, Brazil, Kaohshiung Museum of Fine Arts, Taiwan, Art Gallery of Ontario, Canada, Museum of Modern Art, Bologna, Italy, San Francsico Museum of Modern Art, New Museum of Contemporary Art, New York, P.S.1 Contemporary Art Center, New York, Kettle's Yard, UK, and Govett-Brewster Art Gallery, New Zealand. Her work has been included in numerous articles, catalogues and publications including Sculpture Today by Phaidon (2007) and Akademie X - Lessons in Art + Life (2015). Tse's work is in public collections such as Rhode Island School of Design Museum, RI, M+, Hong Kong and Hong Kong Heritage Museum, Hong Kong.

She received the City of Los Angeles (COLA) Individual Artist Fellowship in 2008, the John Simon Guggenheim Foundation Fellowship in 2009, and the California Community Foundation Fellowship for Visual Artists in 2012. Art commissions included Capp Street Project, San Francisco, CA (2002), and Tse was artist-in-residence at the America Art Foundation Project, Ho Chi Minh City, Vietnam,  The Banff Center for the Arts, Banff, Alberta, Canada, and Skowhegan School of Painting and Sculpture, Skowhegan, ME.

Shirley Tse was selected to represent Hong Kong in the 2019 Venice Biennale, the first woman artist to present a solo show in the Hong Kong Pavilion at the Biennale. The Venice Biennale was open 11May19 through 24nov19.

References

External links
 https://art.calarts.edu/programs/art/program-faculty/shirley-tse
 http://shirleytse.com/files/Velasco.artforum.4.07.pdf
 http://shirleytse.com/files/Rugoff1-01.pdf

1960s births
American contemporary artists
Living people
Artists from Los Angeles
California Institute of the Arts faculty
Hong Kong women artists
Hong Kong artists
Skowhegan School of Painting and Sculpture alumni